The 1925 season was the fourteenth season for Santos FC.

References

External links
Official Site 

Santos
1925
1925 in Brazilian football